Nimbus 7 (also called Nimbus G) was a meteorological satellite. It was the seventh and last in a series of the Nimbus program.

Launch 
Nimbus 7 was launched on October 24, 1978, by a Delta rocket from Vandenberg Air Force Base, California, United States. The spacecraft functioned nominally until 1994. The satellite orbited the Earth once every 1 hour and 34 minutes, at an inclination of 99 degrees.

Mission
Nimbus 7 research and development satellite served as a stabilized, earth-oriented platform for the testing of advanced systems for sensing and collecting data in the pollution, oceanographic and meteorological disciplines. The polar-orbiting spacecraft consisted of three major structures: a hollow torus, shaped sensor mount, solar paddles, and a control housing unit that was connected to the sensor mount by a tripod truss structure.

The sensor mount that formed the satellite base housed the electronics equipment and battery modules. The lower surface of the torus provided mounting space for sensors and antennas. A box-beam structure mounted within the center of the torus provided support for the larger sensor experiments. Mounted on the control housing unit, which was located on top of the spacecraft, were sun sensors, horizon scanners, and a command antenna. The spacecraft spin axis was pointed at the earth. An advanced attitude-control system permitted the spacecraft's orientation to be controlled to within plus or minus 1 deg in all three axes (pitch, roll, and yaw). 8 experiments were selected:

 Coastal-Zone Color Scanner (CZCS)
 Earth Radiation Budget (ERB)
 Limb Infrared Monitoring of the Stratosphere (LIMS)
 Scanning Multichannel Microwave Radiometer (SMMR)
 Solar Backscatter UV and Total Ozone Mapping Spectrometer (SBUV/TOMS)
 Stratospheric Aerosol Measurement II (SAM II)
 Stratospheric and Mesopheric Sounder (SAMS)
 Temperature-Humidity Infrared Radiometer (THIR)

These sensors were capable of observing several parameters at and below the mesospheric levels.

References

External links
 Live Real Time Satellite Tracking and Predictions: Nimbus 7. n2yo.com

Weather satellites of the United States
Spacecraft launched in 1978